Plateados de Cerro Azul is a Mexican football club that plays in the Tercera División de México. The club is based in  Nuevo León.

See also
Football in Mexico
Tercera División de México

External links
Tercera divicion De Mexico

References 

Football clubs in Veracruz